New Valley may refer to:

 New Valley LLC, an investment company based in Miami, Florida
 New Valley Continuation High School, a high school in California
 New Valley Governorate, Egypt
 the New Valley Project, a major irrigation project in Egypt

See also

 New Hall Valley
 New Hope Valley
 New Klang Valley
 New River Valley
 New-Wes-Valley